is a Japanese manga series by Naoshi Arakawa about women's association football. The manga serves as a sequel to Arakawa's 2009 work, Sayonara, Football. The series was serialized in Kodansha's Monthly Shōnen Magazine from May 2016 to December 2020, with the individual chapters were collected in fourteen tankōbon volumes. The series is published in print and in digital in North America by Kodansha Comics. An anime television series adaptation of the series by Liden Films aired from April to June 2021.

Plot
Sumire Suō and Midori Soshizaki are the stars of their respective middle school girls' soccer teams. As they graduate to high school, they end up joining an eclectic cast of other new girls at Warabi Seinan High School, with hopes of taking the school's normally poor-performing team to the top. With the help of former Nadeshiko Japan player Naoko Nōmi as their new coach, they must find a way to defeat powerful new enemies ranging from other nationally-ranked school soccer teams, to their own school's administration.

Characters

Warabi Seinan High School

Girls' Soccer Club

A skilled girl who played on boys' soccer teams for several years (as the main protagonist of Sayonara, Football), thinking the overall level of competition of girls' soccer teams was beneath her, until her middle-school coach convinced her to join a women's team in high school. Despite putting in little effort in practice, Nozomi is an incredibly skilled attacker who tries to stay motivated no matter the opponent. 

The manager of the Warabi girls' team who tries to support them from the sidelines with everything from video analysis to nutrition. 

The captain of her middle school team despite said team winning very few matches. An incredibly fast player with little patience for the eccentricities of her teammates. She decided to join Warabi after seeing Eriko's effort during a losing match and finding a kindred spirit with her.

Sumire's friend and rival throughout middle school who played on a different team, Midori decided to follow Sumire to Warabi so she would not play alone. A newspaper article calls her the #3 defensive midfielder in the nation.

An arrogant prima donna who seems to model herself after Mario Balotelli, a striker who plays incredibly close to the offside line to get scoring chances but makes multiple mistakes that frustrate her teammates.

The Captain of the Warabi Seinan girls' soccer team who struggles to keep the team together when several players leave after the team's poor performance last year. A second-year student who plays on the right wing.

The former Nadeshiko Japan player and World Cup champion who was distraught at the decline of women's soccer throughout the nation. Naoko returns to her alma mater at Warabi to act as the new coach of the women's soccer team.

The incumbent coach of the Warabi women's soccer team who seems apathetic to their performance, spending more time burying his head in a horse racing magazine than paying attention to the team.

Boys' Soccer Club

Fuji Daiichi Junior High School

Kunogi Gakuen High School

Captain of the Kunogi girls' team who normally plays at center-forward, she has a short temper and shows little tolerance for slackers on her team. However, when her crush Ōshio Kohei is nearby, her personality flips, which Sumire used as leverage to make her join their team for the futsal tournament.

An attacking midfielder and gifted technical player for the Kunogi girls' team. After a practice match against Warabi, she became infatuated with Nozomi's playstyle and quickly agreed to team up with her during the futsal tournament.

Urawa Hosei High School

 The ace of Urawa Hosei playing in the role of midfielder, key to the catenaccio tactic played by her team. During middle school was in the same team of Soshizaki and resent her for joining a rival team in high school.

Korenkan High School

A physical defender who was jealous of Haruna's talent while being her teammate in middle school, Rei decided to focus on using her body instead of technical skill.

Media

Manga
Farewell, My Dear Cramer is written and illustrated by Naoshi Arakawa. It began in the June 2016 issue of Monthly Shōnen Magazine, published on May 6, 2016. The title refers to German footballer and manager Dettmar Cramer. The series ended in the January 2021 issue of Monthly Shōnen Magazine, that shipped on December 4, 2020. Kodansha has compiled its chapters into individual tankōbon. The first volume was published on August 17, 2016. As of April 1, 2021, fourteen volumes have been published.

The manga has been simultaneously released in English on Kindle and Comixology. Crunchyroll published the manga starting in 2018. In July 2019, Kodansha Comics announced the print release of the manga. The first volume was released on January 26, 2021, and the 15th is scheduled to be released on February 1, 2023.

Volume list

Anime
An anime television series adaptation was announced in the October issue of Monthly Shōnen Magazine on September 4, 2020. The series is animated by Liden Films and directed by Seiki Takuno, with Natsuko Takahashi handling series composition, and Masaru Yokoyama composing the music. It aired from April 4 to June 27, 2021 on Tokyo MX. Aika Kobayashi performed the series' opening theme song "Ambitious Goal", while Mikako Komatsu performed the series' ending theme song "Kuyashii koto wa Kettobase". Crunchyroll licensed the series outside of Asia. In Southeast Asia, Muse Communication licensed the series and streamed it on Bilibili.

Episode list

Notes

References

External links
 
 
 

2021 anime television series debuts
Anime series based on manga
Association football in anime and manga
Crunchyroll anime
Kodansha manga
Liden Films
Muse Communication
Shōnen manga
Tokyo MX original programming